César Fernando Silvera Fontela (born May 7, 1971 in Montevideo, Uruguay) is a former Uruguayan footballer who played for clubs of Uruguay, Paraguay, Argentina, Chile, Brazil, Spain, Switzerland, Israel and Poland.

Teams
  Peñarol 1991-1993
  Ferro Carril Oeste 1994-1995
  Villarreal 1996
  Olimpia 1996
  Unión Española 1997
  FC Lugano 1997
  Tacuary 1998-1999
  Maccabi Herzliya 2000-2003
  Brasil de Pelotas 2003-2004
  Pogoń Szczecin 2005
  Brasil de Pelotas 2006-2007

References
 Profile at BDFA 
 
 Profile at Tenfield Digital  
 

1971 births
Living people
Uruguayan footballers
Uruguayan expatriate footballers
Uruguay international footballers
Peñarol players
FC Lugano players
Villarreal CF players
Pogoń Szczecin players
Club Olimpia footballers
Club Tacuary footballers
Unión Española footballers
Ferro Carril Oeste footballers
Maccabi Herzliya F.C. players
Grêmio Esportivo Brasil players
Expatriate footballers in Chile
Expatriate footballers in Argentina
Expatriate footballers in Paraguay
Expatriate footballers in Brazil
Expatriate footballers in Spain
Expatriate footballers in Poland
Expatriate footballers in Israel
Uruguayan expatriate sportspeople in Chile
Uruguayan expatriate sportspeople in Argentina
Uruguayan expatriate sportspeople in Paraguay
Uruguayan expatriate sportspeople in Brazil
Uruguayan expatriate sportspeople in Spain
Uruguayan expatriate sportspeople in Poland
Uruguayan expatriate sportspeople in Israel
Association football midfielders